Essendon  is a suburb in Melbourne, Victoria, Australia,  north-west of Melbourne's central business district, located within the City of Moonee Valley local government area. Essendon recorded a population of 21,240 at the 2021 census.

Essendon is bounded in the west by Hoffmans Road, in the north by Keilor Road and Woodland Street, in the east by the Moonee Ponds Creek, and in the south by Buckley Street (except for a small section further south bordering Moonee Ponds).

History

Essendon and the banks of the Maribyrnong River were originally inhabited by the Wurundjeri clan of the Woiwurrung speaking people of the Kulin nation.

In 1803, Charles Grimes and James Fleming were the first known European explorers into the Maribyrnong area.

Essendon was named after the village of Essendon in Hertfordshire, England. Richard Green, who arrived in Victoria in the 1850s and settled near Melbourne, was a native of Essendon, Hertfordshire, where his father Isaac Green was either owner or tenant of Essendon Mill, and he bestowed the name of his native village on the district in which he had made his new home.

In 1851, the gold rush opened up the Moonee Ponds District with miners travelling along Mount Alexander Road to Castlemaine.

Essendon Post Office opened on 18 August 1856.

In 1862, 169 residents sought the formation of the Borough of Essendon and Flemington.

On 9 January 1871, the Victorian Railways services began between Essendon and Melbourne, following an unsuccessful private railway operating from 1860 until 1864.

In the 1880s, the local Council resisted industrial development in the form of cattle saleyards and brickworks, out of concern for pollution of the Maribyrnong River. Instead it embarked on a program to create, in its upper reaches, a playground for rowers, fishermen and swimmers.

In 1890, a large mansion was built in the town. It was designed by eminent architect R.A. Lawson and built at a cost of £35,000. Originally known as Earlsbrae Hall, it was the home of Collier McCracken, a member of a local brewing family. The building now houses Lowther Hall Anglican Grammar School.

In 1906, the North Melbourne Electric Tramway and Lighting Company opened its electric tramway system linking Essendon with the city. The company also supplied electric power to the neighbouring suburbs from its power station on Mount Alexander Road, near the intersection with South Street.

Traditional ownership

The formally recognized traditional owners for the area in which Essendon is located are the Wurundjeri People. The Wurundjeri People are represented by the Wurundjeri Woi Wurrung Cultural Heritage Aboriginal Corporation.

Demographics

The most common other countries of birth were India 4.0%, Italy 2.5%, England 1.7%, China 1.4% and New Zealand 1.2%. 70.8% of people spoke only English at home. Other languages spoken at home included Italian 5.0%, Greek 2.6%, Mandarin 1.6%, Hindi 1.3% and Vietnamese 1.1%. The most common responses for religion were Catholic 38.9% and No Religion 25.4%.

Transport

The number 59 tram provides public transport along Mount Alexander and Keilor Roads to the city.

Train services are available from Essendon station on Rose Street, Glenbervie station on Glass Street, and Strathmore station on Woodland Street, all located on the Craigieburn railway line.

Bus services are also available from Essendon railway station with several routes ending at the station or continuing through to Moonee Ponds.

The suburb is bordered on the south west by the Maribyrnong River Trail, and on the east and north by the Moonee Ponds Creek Trail. Both are used by commuting and recreational cyclists.

Politics

The seat of Essendon, in the Victorian Legislative Assembly, is based on the suburb. The current state member is Danny Pearson, for the Australian Labor Party.

Schools

State;
 Aberfeldie Primary School, Doone Street, Essendon
 Essendon Primary School, Raleigh Street, Essendon
 Essendon North Primary School, Keilor road, North Essendon
 Buckley Park College, Cooper Street, Essendon
 Essendon Keilor College, Buckley Street, Essendon (Senior Campus)

Private;
 St. Therese's Primary School, Edward Street, Essendon
 St. Columba's College, Leslie Road, Essendon
 St. Bernard's College, Rosehill Road, Essendon
 Penleigh and Essendon Grammar School, Raleigh Street, Essendon (Junior School (boys) P-6 and kindergarten campus)
 Lowther Hall Anglican Grammar School, Leslie Road, Essendon

Sport

Essendon is home of the Essendon Football Club (the Bombers), an Australian rules football club which is a member of the Australian Football League. Essendon is one of the most successful football teams in Australia, having won 16 premierships in the VFL/AFL.

The Essendon District Football League is one of the most successful suburban football competitions in Melbourne and in the zone days, fed many players into elite level competition.

Climate

Other

Essendon is the birthplace of the late conservationist and television personality Steve Irwin (best known as "The Crocodile Hunter") (1962–2006), and singer Judith Durham, whom both went to Essendon Primary School.

There are also several churches in Essendon, of various denominations. Baptist churches within the area including the Essendon Community Baptist Church, the International Baptist Church and the Aberfeldie Baptist Church. The closest mosque to Essendon is the Glenroy Sunnah Mosque. Ukrainian Autocephalous Orthodox Church in Diaspora is located in Buckley Street Essendon; nearby the Association of Ukrainians in Victoria (AUV) has its head office in Russell Street Essendon.

See also
 City of Essendon – Essendon was previously within this former local government area.
 Essendon Airport

References

External links

 Essendon Historical Society Inc

 
Suburbs of Melbourne
Suburbs of the City of Moonee Valley